The Innocents is a 2021 supernatural thriller film written and directed by Eskil Vogt. The film premiered in the Un Certain Regard section at the 74th Cannes Film Festival on 11 July 2021.

Plot
Little Ida and her older sister Anna have moved into an apartment with their parents in an apartment complex. Anna is autistic, so Ida has to take responsibility for her sister earlier than one would expect for a child her age. She longs for contact with her peers and gets to know Ben. They make friends. Strange things begin to happen after the two explore the facility's basement. Somehow Anna seems to be able to form a spiritual connection with little Aisha who lives nearby. Soon she begins to speak again too.

Cast
 Rakel Lenora Fløttum as Ida
 Alva Brynsmo Ramstad as Anna
 Sam Ashraf as Ben
 Mina Yasmin Bremseth Asheim as Aisha
 Ellen Dorrit Petersen as Ida and Anna's mother
 Morten Svartveit as Ida and Anna's father
 Kadra Yusuf as Aishas' mother
 Lisa Tønne as Ben's mother

Release
The Innocents had its world premiere at the 74th Cannes Film Festival, in the Un Certain Regard section, on 11 July 2021. It later screened at Fantastic Fest in Austin, Texas, in September 2021. Earlier that same month, the film's U.S. distribution rights were acquired by IFC Midnight, and it had a limited release on 13 May 2022. It was released on VOD by RLJ Entertainment on 18 October 2022.

Reception

Box office
The Innocents grossed $25,705 in the United States and Canada, and $206,366 in other territories for a worldwide total of $232,071, against a production budget of 3.2-3.4 million.

Critical response
 

Leslie Felperin of The Hollywood Reporter called the film "low-tech, high-tension", writing that "The lonely, uncanny and sometimes unthinkingly violent world of childhood is explored with chilling candor and exceptional skill".  Jessica Kiang of Variety praised the performances of the child actors as well as the film's atmosphere, calling the film "both a satisfying genre exercise and a minute observation of the process by which young children acquire morality." Sight & Sounds Anton Bitel wrote that the film "uses its genre frame to show the connectedness, curiosity and cruelty of its young characters, and also asks whether the inevitable loss of innocence at this age is a slate that can ever simply be cleaned."

References

External links
 
 

2020s Norwegian-language films
2020s Swedish-language films
2020s Finnish-language films
2020s supernatural thriller films
2021 films
2021 thriller films
Films about autism
Films about children
Films about mind control
Films about telekinesis
Films about telepathy
Films directed by Eskil Vogt
Films set in Norway
Films with screenplays by Eskil Vogt
Norwegian thriller films
Swedish thriller films
Finnish thriller films